The women's basketball tournament at the 2017 Southeast Asian Games was held in Kuala Lumpur, Malaysia at the MABA Stadium from 20 to 26 August. Host nation Malaysia won their second consecutive and 14th overall gold medal, with Thailand and Indonesia winning the silver and bronze medals, respectively.

Competition schedule
The following was the competition schedule for the women's basketball competitions:

Draw
There was no official draw conducted. All teams were automatically placed into one group.

Competition format
The tournament followed a single round robin format with the top team by the end of the tournament winning the gold medal.

Results
All times are Malaysia Standard Time (UTC+8)

Round robin

Final standings

See also
Men's tournament

References

Women